Zospeum biscaiense is a species of air-breathing land snail, a terrestrial pulmonate gastropod mollusk in the family Ellobiidae, the salt marsh snails. This species is endemic to Spain.

References

 Gómez, B. J & Prieto, C. E. 1983. Zospeum biscaiense nov. sp. (Gastropoda, Ellobiidae), otro molusco troglobio para la Península Ibérica. Speleon 26-27: 7-10. Barcelona. November 1983 (as on title page of volume).

Ellobiidae
Endemic fauna of Spain
Gastropods described in 1983
Taxonomy articles created by Polbot

Endemic molluscs of the Iberian Peninsula